Sean Sowerby (born 28 June 1983) is an Australian sports presenter and reporter.

Career
Sowerby's media career began at 3AW as a producer and reporter after graduating from Melbourne University and Australian Catholic University. He produced a number of programs at the station including Sports Today, Glossing Over as well as majoring sporting events such as the 2006 Melbourne Commonwealth Games and 2004 Athens Olympic Games.

In 2006 Sowerby allowed an incorrect attribution of himself as a Melbourne Victory fan in a TV interview for Nine News, withholding that he was in fact a producer at 3AW at the time. He provided mobile phone video footage of fans singing as proof of "violence" in the crowd that he alleged.

In December 2006, Sowerby moved to WIN TV where he held a number of positions on WIN News including head sports reporter, sports presenter and bureau chief. He also worked as host of the popular country football show Off The Bench alongside Danny Frawley, Liam Pickering, Wayne Schwass, Terry Wallace and Craig Hutchison.

In July 2012, Sowerby resigned from WIN TV after 5 years with the station to move to Melbourne. He later joined Network Ten in Melbourne to become a senior news reporter on Ten News.

In December 2012, Sowerby moved to the Seven Network to join Seven News as a sports reporter.

In February 2014, Sowerby was appointed weekend sports presenter on Seven News Melbourne replacing Tim Watson. He remained in the position until September 2018, when he was replaced by Jacqueline Felgate. Sowerby remains a sport reporter and fill in sport presenter.

It announced in the early 2021, that Andrew McCormack is going to take-over Sowerby’s space to present sport from the Seven Network.

In May 2021, Sowerby resigned from the Seven Network after almost 9 years.

Personal life
In January 2012, Sowerby married Bianca Earle at St Peter's Anglican Church in Brighton. They have three children.

References

Seven News presenters
Australian sports journalists
1983 births
Living people